Comayagua is one of the 18 departments (departamentos) into which Honduras is divided. The departmental capital is Comayagua.

Geography
The department covers a total surface area of 5,124 km² and, in 2015, had an estimated population of 511,943 people.

Economy

Historically, the department produced gold, copper, cinnabar, asbestos, and silver. Gems were also mined, including opal and emerald. The area was also known for "fine" cattle.

Municipalities

 Ajuterique
 Comayagua
 El Rosario
 Esquías
 Humuya
 La Libertad
 Lamaní
 Las Lajas
 La Trinidad
 Lejamaní
 Meámbar
 Minas de Oro
 Ojos de Agua
 San Jerónimo
 San José de Comayagua
 San José del Potrero
 San Luis
 San Sebastián
 Siguatepeque
 Taulabé
 Villa de San Antonio

Notes

References

 
Departments of Honduras

eo:Comayagua